Christian Democratic Union of Youth (CDUY) is the autonomous youth wing of the Ukrainian political party Christian Democratic Union. It offers its 2000 members. It is an observer member of the European Christian Political Youth Network. It was founded on 9 September 2005.

 Chairman: Ihor Lubyanov
 Vice President: Anton Bondarev
 General Secretary: Hanna Bulavintseva

Chairmen 
 1 Eduard Ilyin 2005-2007
 2 Mykhailo Kolibabchuk 2007-2009
 3 Ihor Lubyanov 2009-

See also 
 Christian Democratic Union (Ukraine)

External links 
 Christian Democratic Union

Christian democracy in Europe
Youth wings of political parties in Ukraine